As of November 2022, Fiji Airways operates scheduled services to 26 international destinations in 14 countries, including charter destinations. This list does not include destinations served by subsidiary Fiji Link.

List

References

Lists of airline destinations